Nye is an unincorporated community located in the town of Osceola, Polk County, Wisconsin, United States. Nye is located 6.5 miles east of Osceola, and less than 1 mile west of Horse Lake.

Business
The Viking Gas Transmission Company Heliport is in Nye.

Notable person
David E. Paulson, farmer and politician, was born in Nye.

Notes

Unincorporated communities in Polk County, Wisconsin
Unincorporated communities in Wisconsin